WallyIsland was a  steel motor yacht proposal published by Wally Yachts in 2007. She was intended to be one of the world's largest private yachts.

The defining feature of WallyIsland was her large main deck area. The main deck and the three upper decks featured a large swimming pool, garden spaces, tennis or mini soccer field, a helipad, guest sleeping quarters, a master suite, main saloon, living/dining room, library, theater, spa, fitness area, as well as service and crew areas. The aft deck provided storage areas for tenders, and water toys. The vessel as designed to sleep 24 guests.

External links

Proposed_ships